Nodal modulator 1 is a protein that in humans is encoded by the NOMO1 gene.

This gene encodes a protein originally thought to be related to the collagenase gene family. This gene is one of three highly similar genes in a region of duplication located on the p arm of chromosome 16. These three genes encode closely related proteins that may have the same function. The protein encoded by one of these genes has been identified as part of a protein complex that participates in the Nodal signaling pathway during vertebrate development. Mutations in ABCC6, which is located nearby, rather than mutations in this gene are associated with pseudoxanthoma elasticum (PXE).

References

Further reading